Too Too is a Burmese Lethwei fighter and who competes in the World Lethwei Championship. He is former the WLC Middleweight World champion and is undefeated under traditional Lethwei rules, holding the 75 kg Lethwei Golden Belt since 2015. He also competed in the only Lethwei superfight at Kunlun Fight 25 in Slovakia.

Career 
In 2013, Too Too took took part in the 2013 Southeast Asian Games and 2013 Asian Indoor and Martial Arts Games in Incheon, South Korea winning the gold and bronze medal respectively.

On May 12, 2013, Too Too faced former Golden belt champion Win Tun at Thuwunna Stadium.
After landing a series of punches to the face and body, Too Too knocked out Win Tun in the third round.

On November 27, 2016, Too Too faced Peruvian Muaythai fighter Mateo Celi at Thein Pyu Stadium winning the fight by KO.

On January 6, 2017, in Mandalay, Myanmar, Too Too faced world's ninth ranked Muaythai fighter Chanajon P.K. Saenchai from Saenchai's gym, which ended in a draw.

Kunlun Fight 
In 2015, Too Too competed in a Lethwei superfight at Kunlun Fight 25 in Banska Bystrica, Slovakia. He faced Igor Danis at 75 kg in the event organized in partnership with Kunlun Fight and the Slovakia Lethwei Association. The event was billed as the European Premiere of Lethwei marking the first Lethwei fights hosted in Europe. Too Too dominated the match and inflicted heavy damage to his opponent. The match was ruled a draw under Traditional rules.

Monsoon Fighter 
In July 2015, Too Too faced American Muay Thai fighter Cyrus Washington in the Monsoon Fighter event at Thein Pyu Stadium in Yangon. The match went for seven rounds rather than the sport's typical five. Too Too retained his undefeated record. The fight ended in a draw, but said he did not want to fight for this long again.

Versus Leduc 
In August 2016, Too Too faced Quebecer fighter Dave Leduc at the 1st Myanmar Lethwei World Championship. During the fight, Leduc locked Too Too in a clinch and administered multiple blows to the head with his elbows and knees. Despite Leduc dominating the fight, Too Too remained standing to last out the five rounds resulting in a draw according to traditional Lethwei rules, knockout only to win, which necessitated a knockout to have a winner.

Lethwei in Japan 
On October 27, 2016, Too Too compete in Lethwei Grand Prix Japan 2016, inaugurating the first event held by the ILFJ. The event took place the at Korakuen Hall in Tokyo, Japan and Too Too faced another Lethwei legend in Soe Lin Oo. With no knockout after 5 rounds, the bout was declared a draw according to traditional Lethwei rules.

World Lethwei Championship 
In 2017, Too Too signed an exclusive contract with World Lethwei Championship. Despite being both among the top ranked Lethwei fighters in Myanmar and both signed to the WLC, Tun Tun Min and Too Too have refused to fight each other due to their long-lasting friendship.

 Tuhtaboyev rematch 

In 2014, both men had fought each other under Muay Thai rules at Thai Fight in Thailand, with Tuhtaboyev won by split decision. Since then, Too Too had been celebrated in his home country of Myanmar, winning the WLC Middleweight World Champion title in 2018. Meanwhile, Tuhtaboyev had been more focused on Muay Thai, having been involved in several big fights. In their rematch under Lethwei rules, the WLC Middleweight World Championship would be on the line.

As the reigning WLC Middleweight champion, Too Too received a challenge from a former opponent Naimjon Tuhtaboyev. On January 31, 2020, Too Too faced Naimjon Tuhtaboyev inside the Thein Pyu Stadium at WLC 11: Battlebones and the event was streamed live on UFC Fight Pass. Both fighters were eyeing a knockout, with Too Too being effective with his leg kicks and headbutts. However, judges gave Tuhtaboyev the victory via close split decision.

Outside the ring 

Anti-coup activism

In 2022, Too Too was actively protesting and taking part in the anti-coup protests and was arrested for taking part in demonstrations against the 2021 Myanmar coup d'état. Too Too was arrested at his home in Minbu Township in Myanmar’s Magway Region with weapons and explosives in his possession.

Championships and accomplishments 
 Championships 

 Lethwei World Champion
 75 kg Lethwei Golden Belt
 Thirty-tree successful title defenses
 World Lethwei Championship
 WLC Middleweight World Championship
 One successful title defense

Other championships
 2019 Air KBZ Fight 6 Championship Champion
 2013 Dagon Shwe Aung Lan Tournament Champion
  2013 Southeast Asian Games - Naypyidaw, Myanmar
  2012 Asian Muay Championships - Ho Chi Minh City
  2013 Dagon Shwe Aung Lan tournament - Yangon
  2013 Prime Minister's Cup - Naypyidaw
  2013 Asian Indoor Martial Arts Games  - Incheon, South Korea

Lethwei record 

|- style="background:#fbb;"
| 2020-01-31 || Loss || align="left" | Naimjon Tuhtaboyev ||  WLC 11: Battlebones ||Yangon, Myanmar || Decision || 5 || 
|-
! style=background:white colspan=9 |
|- style="background:#cfc;"
| 2019-11-03 || Win || align="left" | Tokeshi Kohei|| Air KBZ Fight 6 || Yangon, Myanmar || KO || 4 ||
|-
! style=background:white colspan=9 |
|- style="background:#c5d2ea;"
| 2019-08-18 || Draw || align="left" | Fabio Ferrari|| 2019 Myanmar Lethwei World Championship ||Yangon, Myanmar || Draw || 5 || 
|- style="background:#cfc;"
| 2019-04-14 || Win || align="left" | Dechrid Sathian Muaythai Gym || Thingyan Fight Chitthu Myaing Park || Hpa-an, Myanmar || KO || 1 ||
|- style="background:#cfc;"
| 2018-02-17 || Win || align="left" | Vasyl Sorokin|| WLC 4: Bare-knuckle King || Naypyidaw, Myanmar || Decision || 5 ||
|-
|- style="background:#cfc;"
| 2017-11-04 || Win || align="left" | Louis Michael Badato|| WLC 3: Legendary Champions || Yangon, Myanmar || Decision || 5 ||
|-
! style=background:white colspan=9 |
|- style="background:#cfc;"
| 2017-06-10 || Win || align="left" | James Benal|| WLC 2: Ancient Warriors || Yangon, Myanmar || Decision || 5 ||
|- style="background:#cfc;"
| 2017-03-03 || Win || align="left" | Eddie Farrell|| WLC 1: The Great Beginning || Yangon, Myanmar || Decision || 5 ||
|- style="background:#c5d2ea;" |-
| 2017-01-06 || Draw || align="left" | Chanajon PK Saenchai|| Myanmar-Thailand-Laos Challenge Fights || Mandalay, Myanmar|| Draw || 5 ||
|- style="background:#cfc;"
| 2016-11-27 || Win || align="left" | Matteo Celi|| Mandalay Rumbling Challenge Fight || Yangon, Myanmar || KO || 3 ||
|- style="background:#c5d2ea;" |-
| 2016-10-27 || Draw || align="left" | Soe Lin Oo || Lethwei Grand Prix in Japan 2016|| Tokyo, Japan|| Draw || 5 ||
|- style="background:#cfc;"
| 2016-10-09 || Win || align="left" | Berneung Topkingboxing || GTG International Challenge Fights 2016 || Yangon, Myanmar || KO (Punches) || 3 ||
|- style="background:#c5d2ea;" |-
| 2016-08-21 || Draw || align="left" | Dave Leduc || 2016 Myanmar Lethwei World Championship || Yangon, Myanmar|| Draw || 5 ||
|-  style="background:#cfc;"
| 2016-04-02 || Win ||align=left| Artem Sushkov || Max Thingyan Fight || Yangon, Myanmar || KO || 4 ||
|-  style="background:#cfc;"
| 2016-02-03 || Win ||align=left| Vladimir Shuliak || Win Sein Taw Ya 2016 || Mudon, Myanmar || KO || 3 ||
|-  style="background:#cfc;"
| 2016-01-13 || Win ||align=left| Kyal Linn Aung || (25th) Karen New Year festival || Hpa-an, Myanmar || KO || 5 ||
|- style="background:#c5d2ea;" |-
| 2015-09-27 || Draw || align="left" | Saw Gaw Mu Do || Mandalay Rumbling Mega Fights || Yangon, Myanmar|| Draw || 5 ||
|-  style="background:#cfc;"
| 2015-08-30 || Win ||align=left| Matthew Richardson || All Star Big Fight || Yangon, Myanmar || KO || 4 ||
|- style="background:#c5d2ea;" |-
| 2015-07-26 || Draw || align="left" | Cyrus Washington || Monsoon Fight || Yangon, Myanmar|| Draw || 7 ||
|- style="background:#c5d2ea;" |-
| 2015-05-15 || Draw || align="left" | Igor Danis || Kunlun Fight 25 || Banská Bystrica, Slovakia|| Draw || 5 ||
|- style="background:#c5d2ea;" |-
| 2015-04-03 || Draw || align="left" | Petchtae Tor.Maxmuaythai || Mon-Myanmar-Thai Challenge Fights || Ye Township, Myanmar|| Draw || 5 ||
|- style="background:#c5d2ea;" |-
| 2015-03-25 || Draw || align="left" | Soe Lin Oo || Thaung Pyin Lethwei Challenge Fights || Ye Township, Myanmar|| Draw || 5 ||
|- style="background:#c5d2ea;" |-
| 2015-02-06 || Draw || align="left" | Saw Yan Paing || Taungbon village 68th Mon National Day || Ye Township, Myanmar|| Draw || 5 ||
|-  style="background:#cfc;"
| 2014-12-28 || Win ||align=left| Edward || International Letwhay Challenge Fights || Yangon, Myanmar || KO || 3 ||
|-  style="background:#cfc;"
| 2014-11-02 || Win ||align=left| Matheus Robin || One on One International Challenge Fight || Yangon, Myanmar || KO || 3 ||
|- style="background:#c5d2ea;" |-
| 2014-08-17 || Draw || align="left" | Saw Nga Man || Mandalay Rumbling Champion Challenge || Yangon, Myanmar|| Draw || 5 ||
|-
! style=background:white colspan=9 |
|- style="background:#c5d2ea;" |-
| 2014-07-06 || Draw || align="left" | Petchtae Tor.Maxmuaythai || Myanmar vs. Thailand Challenge Fights || Yangon, Myanmar|| Draw || 5 ||
|- style="background:#c5d2ea;" |-
| 2014-06-01 || Draw || align="left" | Soe Lin Oo || Lethwei Challenge Fights || Yangon, Myanmar|| Draw || 5 ||
|- style="background:#c5d2ea;" |-
| 2014-04-13 || Draw || align="left" | Kyal Linn Aung || Thaung Pyin Lethwei Challenge Fights || Ye Township, Myanmar|| Draw || 5 ||
|- style="background:#c5d2ea;" |-
| 2014-03-30 || Draw || align="left" | Rachenlek Maesotmuaythai || Kalaw Thaw village Challenge Fights || Mudon, Myanmar|| Draw || 5 ||
|-  style="background:#cfc;"
| 2014-03-15 || Win ||align=left| Yodtang || Lamaing town Challenge Fights || Ye Township, Myanmar || KO || 5 ||
|-  style="background:#cfc;"
| 2014-02-14 || Win ||align=left| Yodkunkrai Por.Wiriya || Shwe Sa Daw Challenge Fights || Ye, Mon State, Myanmar || KO || 3 ||
|- style="background:#c5d2ea;" |-
| 2014-01-26 || Draw || align="left" | Wanchana Hua Hin || Win Sein Taw Ya 2014 || Mudon, Myanmar|| Draw || 5 ||
|-  style="background:#cfc;"
| 2013-05-12 || Win ||align=left| Win Tun || Lethwei Challenge Fights || Yangon, Myanmar || KO || 3 ||
|-  style="background:#cfc;"
| 2013-03 || Win ||align=left| Daung Thi Chae || Lamaing town Challenge Fights || Ye Township, Myanmar || KO ||  ||
|-  style="background:#cfc;"
| 2013-02-17 || Win ||align=left| Thutti Aung || Lethwei Challenge Fights || Yangon, Myanmar || KO ||  ||
|-  style="background:#cfc;"
| 2013-02-05 || Win ||align=left| Rajchasie || Win Sein Taw Ya 2013 || Mudon, Myanmar || KO || 4 ||
|-  style="background:#cfc;"
| 2013-01-20 || Win ||align=left| Petpakai || Myanmar vs. Thailand Challenge Fights || Yangon, Myanmar || TKO ||  ||
|-  style="background:#cfc;"
| 2013-01-06 || Win ||align=left| Phoe Thar Gyi || Dagon Shwe Aung Lan 2013 final || Yangon, Myanmar || Decision || 5 ||
|-  style="background:#cfc;"
| 2012-12-23 || Win ||align=left| Tha Pyay Nyo || Dagon Shwe Aung Lan 2013 semi-final || Yangon, Myanmar || KO || 2 ||
|-  style="background:#cfc;"
| 2012-12-16 || Win ||align=left| Kyan Sit Aung || Dagon Shwe Aung Lan 2013 quarter-final || Yangon, Myanmar || KO ||  ||
|-  style="background:#cfc;"
| 2012-10-28 || Win ||align=left| Wunna || Magway Challenge Fights || Magway, Myanmar || KO || 2 ||
|- style="background:#c5d2ea;" |-
| 2012-09-23 || Draw || align="left" | Dawna Aung || Aung Myay Mandalar Indoor Stadium || Mandalay, Myanmar|| Draw || 5 ||
|- style="background:#c5d2ea;" |-
| 2012-05-04 || Draw || align="left" | Tha Pyay Nyo || Kaytumadi Indoor Stadium || Taungoo, Myanmar|| Draw || 5 ||
|- style="background:#c5d2ea;" |-
| 2011 || Draw || align="left" | Dawna Aung || Lamaing town Challenge Fights || Ye Township, Myanmar|| Draw || 5 ||
|-  style="background:#cfc;"
| 2011-12-24 || Win ||align=left| Mondaing || Karen New Year 2751 Insein Township || Yangon, Myanmar || KO ||  ||
|- style="background:#c5d2ea;" |-
| 2011-11-06 || Draw || align="left" | Dawna Aung || Myanmar vs. Australia Lethwei Challenge Fights || Yangon, Myanmar|| Draw || 5 ||
|- style="background:#c5d2ea;" |-
| 2011-09-18 || Draw || align="left" | Shwe Moe Kaung || Champion Challenge Cup Tournament || Myitkyina, Myanmar|| Draw || 5 ||
|- style="background:#c5d2ea;" |-
| 2011-08-14 || Draw || align="left" | Kyan Sit Aung || Myanmar-Japan Goodwill Letwhay Challenge Fights (Day 1) || Yangon, Myanmar|| Draw || 5 ||
|- style="background:#c5d2ea;" |-
| 2011 || Draw || align="left" | Tun Tun Min || Lethwei Challenge Fights || Myanmar|| Draw || 5 ||
|- style="background:#c5d2ea;" |-
| 2011 || Draw || align="left" | Pe Pyar Maung Maung || Lethwei Challenge Fights || Myanmar|| Draw ||  ||
|-  style="background:#cfc;"
| 2011-05-04 || Win ||align=left| Shan Thway Lay || Kaytumadi Indoor Stadium || Taungoo, Myanmar || KO ||  ||
|- style="background:#c5d2ea;" |-
| 2010-12-31 || Draw || align="left" | Thar Chaung Thar || Lethwei Challenge Fights || Yangon, Myanmar|| Draw || 4 ||
|-  style="background:#cfc;"
| 2010-11-21 || Win ||align=left| Shwe Kyar Phyu || Kaytumadi Indoor Stadium || Taungoo, Myanmar || KO || 1 ||
|- style="background:#c5d2ea;" |-
| 2010 || Draw || align="left" | Ko U Lay || Lethwei Challenge Fights || Myanmar|| Draw || 4 ||
|-
| colspan=9 | Legend:

Muay Thai record 

|-  style="background:#fbb;"
| 2014-10-25 || Loss ||align=left|  Naimjon Tuhtaboyev || Thai Fight Kard Chuek || Bangkok, Thailand || Decision || 3 || 3:00
|-  style="background:#cfc;"
| 2013-12-22 || Win ||align=left|  Panupan Tanjad|| 2013 SEA Games || Naypyidaw, Myanmar || Decision || 3 || 3:00
|-  style="background:#cfc;"
| 2013-12-19 || Win||align=left| Nouna Ngeumsangouane || 2013 SEA Games || Naypyidaw, Myanmar || Decision || 3 || 3:00
|-  style="background:#fbb;"
| 2013-07-01 || Loss||align=left| Masoud Minaei || 2013 Southeast Asian Games || Incheon, South Korea || Decision || 3 || 3:00
|-  style="background:#cfc;"
| 2013-06-30 || Win ||align=left|  Son Jun-heok|| 2013 Southeast Asian Games ||Incheon, South Korea || Decision || 3 || 3:00
|-  style="background:#cfc;"
| 2013-06-29 || Win ||align=left|  Salar Al-Mouead|| 2013 Southeast Asian Games || Incheon, South Korea || Decision || 3  || 3:00
|-
| colspan=9 | Legend:

References

External links
 Facebook Fan page

Living people
1989 births
Burmese Lethwei practitioners
Southeast Asian Games gold medalists for Myanmar
Kunlun Fight Fighters
Competitors at the 2013 Southeast Asian Games
Prisoners and detainees of Myanmar